Val d'Adige (German: Etschtal) is one of the sixteen districts of Trentino in the Italian region of Trentino-Alto Adige/Südtirol. Unlike the other fifteen, it is a territory without an administrative seat. The major town part of its area is Trento.

Overview 

The territory was named after the alpine valley of the Adige and succeeds the old and homonym district. As the other Valley Communities, it was created in 2006 with a provincial law, when the old ones were abolished. The four municipalities composing it perform their community functions associated by a convention.

Subdivisions 

Val d'Adige territory is composed by the following 4 municipalities:
Trento
Aldeno
Cimone
Garniga Terme

References

External links 
 Valley communities (districts) of Trentino

Districts of Trentino
States and territories established in 2006